The Golden Globe (Portugal) for Best Newcomer is awarded annually at the Golden Globes (Portugal) to one of the best Portuguese personalities which had their first success the previous year.

Winners

References 

Awards established in 1996
Golden Globes (Portugal)